The 1982 NFL season was the 63rd regular season of the National Football League. A 57-day-long players' strike reduced the 1982 season from a 16-game schedule per team to an abbreviated nine game schedule. Because of the shortened season, the NFL adopted a special 16-team playoff tournament; division standings were ignored for seeding (although each division sent at least two teams, except the NFC West which had only one). Eight teams from each conference were seeded 1–8 based on their regular season records. Two teams qualified for the playoffs despite losing records (the Cleveland Browns and the Detroit Lions). The season ended with Super Bowl XVII when the Washington Redskins defeated the Miami Dolphins 27–17 at the Rose Bowl stadium.

Before the season, a verdict was handed down against the league in the trial brought by the Oakland Raiders and the Los Angeles Memorial Coliseum back in 1980. The jury ruled that the NFL violated antitrust laws when it declined to approve the proposed move by the team from Oakland to Los Angeles. Thus, the league was forced to let the officially renamed "Los Angeles Raiders" play in the second largest city in the United States, returning football to the Los Angeles area proper following a two-year absence (the Los Angeles Rams left the Coliseum for Anaheim Stadium in Orange County in 1980). 

For the start of the 1982 season, the Minnesota Vikings moved from Metropolitan Stadium to the Hubert H. Humphrey Metrodome.

Player movement

Transactions
August 25, 1982: Quarterback Ken Stabler, winner of Super Bowl XI with the Oakland Raiders, signed with the New Orleans Saints.

Traded
September 18, 1982: The New Orleans Saints traded longtime starter Archie Manning to the Houston Oilers for offensive tackle Leon Gray.

Retirements
February 10, 1982: Four-time Super Bowl champion Mean Joe Greene announces his retirement.

Draft
The 1982 NFL Draft was held from April 27 to 28, 1982 at New York City's Sheraton Hotel. With the first pick, the New England Patriots selected defensive end Kenneth Sims from the University of Texas.

Major rule changes
The penalty for incidental grabbing of a facemask that is committed by the defensive team changed from five yards and an automatic first down to only five yards with no automatic first down. The incidental facemask penalty was eliminated for the 2008 season. 
The penalties for illegally kicking, batting, or punching the ball changed from 15 yards to 10 yards.
This was the first season that the NFL recorded quarterback sacks as an official statistic.

Regular season

New Sunday time slots
For the first time all Sunday afternoon games began in one of two windows: 1:00 p.m. ET/noon CT for early games, or 4:00 p.m. ET/1:00 p.m. PT for late games. From 1970 to 1981, most games began at 1 p.m. local time regardless of the home team (except in Denver, where the Broncos kick off at 2 p.m. MT). An exception to this rule was made for the Baltimore Colts, who were forced to begin Sunday home games no earlier than 2 p.m. Eastern due to a Baltimore ordinance, since repealed, which prohibited Sunday sporting events from beginning prior to that hour. That ordinance was cited by owner Robert Irsay as a burden and a factor in moving the franchise to Indianapolis in March 1984.

1982 players' strike
Players began a 57-day strike following the completion of Week 2 of the regular season. As a result of the impasse, games were simply cancelled until a settlement was reached (ultimately, Weeks 3 to 10). Upon reaching that settlement, the NFL announced that Weeks 11 to 16 would be played as scheduled, and the games originally scheduled for Week 3 of the season would be played following the completion of the resumed regular season as a new Week 17, with the playoffs pushed back one week. Later, the NFL decided to use the final week 17 to hold various intra-division games from cancelled Weeks 3 to 10 instead of merely playing the Week 3 games. This was done to increase attendance and to allow some teams to balance out home and away games, to the extent possible (either five home and four away, or four home and five away). Because the 1982 shortened season would include only nine regular season contests for each team, the NFL announced that the three divisions in each of the two conferences would be eliminated for the purpose of determining playoff qualifications, and the regular season would be followed by an expansion of the playoffs from 10 to 16 teams. With this, each conference had 14 teams competing for 8 playoff spots, with division standings being disregarded in favor of overall conference standings.
The Washington Redskins were the Super Bowl winners.

Final standings

Clinched playoff seeds are marked in parentheses and shaded in green

Tiebreakers
AFC
Miami finished ahead of Cincinnati based on better conference record (6–1 to Bengals' 6–2).
Pittsburgh finished ahead of San Diego based on better record against common opponents (3–1 to Chargers' 2–1) after N.Y. Jets were bumped to the 6th seed from three-way tie based on conference record (Pittsburgh and San Diego 5–3 to Jets' 2–3).
Cleveland finished ahead of Buffalo and Seattle based on better conference record (4–3 to Bills' 3–3 to Seahawks' 3–5).
Buffalo finished ahead of Seattle based on better conference record (3–3 to Seahawks' 3–5).
NFC
Minnesota (4–1), Atlanta (4–3), St. Louis (5–4), Tampa Bay (3–3) seeds were determined by best won-lost record in conference games.
Detroit finished ahead of New Orleans and the N.Y. Giants based on best conference record (4–4 to Saints' 3–5 to Giants' 3–5).
San Francisco finished ahead of Chicago, and Chicago finished ahead of Philadelphia, based on conference record (49ers' 2–3 to Bears' 2–5 to Eagles' 1–5).

Playoffs

Each of the first three rounds of the playoffs was pushed back one week in order to make room for the new week 17, which was originally scheduled as the Wild Card weekend. This was possible because there was an idle week between the Conference Championship games and the Super Bowl. The Super Bowl was held as originally scheduled.

Bracket

Until this season, no team ever reached the post-season with a losing record. The Cleveland Browns and Detroit Lions both made playoff appearances with 4–5 records. It would be 28 years before another team with a losing record would make the post-season (however, this would be accomplished in a full season).

The postseason would mark several "firsts" and "lasts" for several teams and players:
 This was the Cardinals' first postseason appearance since 1975 and last postseason game representing St. Louis. The franchise relocated to Arizona in 1988 and did not return to the playoffs until 1998. The Cardinals were 0-3 in playoff games representing St. Louis, with all three on the road. 
The Rams gave St. Louis its first home playoff games en route to winning Super Bowl XXXIV following the 1999 season. 
 This marked Terry Bradshaw's final appearance at Three Rivers Stadium. He sat out nearly all of the 1983 season with an elbow injury, appearing in just one half of a late-season game against the Jets in what turned out to be their final game at Shea Stadium. It would also be the final appearance of fellow Hall of Famers Lynn Swann and Jack Ham, both of whom would retire in the offseason, the last home playoff game of head coach Chuck Noll (who would coach eight more years, with the Steelers either missing the playoffs or only playing away playoff games), and the Steelers last home playoff game until 1992.
 This was Tampa Bay's last playoff game until 1997, by which time the Buccaneers replaced their orange uniforms. From 1983 to 1996, they suffered 14 consecutive losing seasons, 13 of which saw Tampa Bay lose 10 or more games.
 This would be Atlanta's last playoff appearance until the 1991 season.
 This was the final postseason appearance in the Hall of Fame careers of Chargers stars Dan Fouts, Charlie Joiner, and Kellen Winslow. All would remain with the Chargers until at least 1986, but the Chargers would not return to the postseason until 1992.
 This would be the Packers first postseason appearance since 1972 and only the second since Vince Lombardi stepped down as head coach following the 1967 season, as well as the team's only postseason victory between the Lombardi and Brett Favre eras. The Packers would not play another postseason game until 1993.
 This would be the final playoff win in Cowboys' coach Tom Landry's career. It would be the Cowboys last playoff victory until 1991. After appearing in 10 of the previous 13 NFC Championship games, this would be Dallas' last appearance until 1992.

Awards

Coaching changes

Offseason
Baltimore Colts: Frank Kush replaced the fired Mike McCormack.
Chicago Bears: Mike Ditka replaced the fired Neill Armstrong.
New England Patriots: Ron Meyer replaced the fired Ron Erhardt.

In-season
Seattle Seahawks: Jack Patera was fired during the players strike after the team lost their first two games. Mike McCormack, the team's director of football operations, took over as interim for the remainder of the season.

Stadium changes
 The relocated Los Angeles Raiders moved from the Oakland–Alameda County Coliseum to the Los Angeles Memorial Coliseum
 The Minnesota Vikings moved from Metropolitan Stadium in Bloomington to the Metrodome in Minneapolis

Uniform changes
 The league discontinued the 1979 numbering system for officials, with officials numbered separately by position, and reverted to the original system where each NFL official was assigned a random number regardless of position. Officials who were in the league in 1978 were allowed to reclaim their old number or switch to a number used by a 1978 official who had since retired or was not in use in 1978; officials hired beginning in 1979 then picked from remaining numbers based upon seniority. Also the officials' position was now abbreviated on the back of the uniform instead of being spelled out in full.
 The Baltimore Colts began wearing gray pants with their blue jerseys. The gray pants featured a horseshoe on each hip, with the player's number inside the horseshoe. 
 The Chicago Bears switched from gray to blue face masks.
 The Detroit Lions switched from silver to white numbers on their blue jerseys.
 The Dallas Cowboys added elliptical blue circles with the player's number to the hip area of the pants.
 The St. Louis Cardinals repeated their helmet logo on the sleeves of their white jerseys.

Television
ABC, CBS, and NBC each signed five-year contracts to renew their rights to broadcast Monday Night Football, the NFC package, and the AFC package, respectively. The major change was that ABC was allowed into the Super Bowl rotation beginning with Super Bowl XIX at the end of the 1984 season.

Len Berman replaced Bryant Gumbel as host on NBC's pregame show NFL '82. Pete Axthelm also joined the show as a studio analyst.

With games canceled during the players' strike, CBS sent Pat Summerall and John Madden, and some of their other regular NFL announcing crews, to instead call a few college football Division II and III games. NBC acquired the rights to air the Canadian Football League for those weeks, sending Dick Enberg and Merlin Olsen, and their other regular NFL announcing crews to those games.

During this season, the new Channel 4 in the United Kingdom began its coverage of the NFL which was to earn a substantial following during English soccer's low point of the mid-1980s.  However, the first match shown - between the Dallas Cowboys and the Pittsburgh Steelers - had been played some time before it was shown in the UK, because coverage began during the players' strike.

References

NFL Record and Fact Book
NFL History 1981–1990  (Last accessed December 4, 2005)
Total Football: The Official Encyclopedia of the National Football League
1982 NFL season at Football Reference

National Football League seasons
National Football League